The 2016 World University Wrestling Championships were the 12th edition of World University Wrestling Championships of combined events and were held from 25 to 30 October in Çorum, Turkey.

Medal table

Team ranking

Medal summary

Men's freestyle

Men's Greco-Roman

Women's freestyle

See also 
 FISU World University Championships
 World Wrestling Championships

References

External links 
 FISU - Archives from October 2016
 INTERNATIONAL SENIOR 12th WORLD UNIVERSITIES WRESTLING CHAMPIONSHIP

World University Wrestling Championships
2016 in sport wrestling
World University Wrestling Championships
Sports competitions in Turkey